Henry Reynolds  (16 August 1883 – 26 March 1948) was an English recipient of the Victoria Cross, the highest and most prestigious award for gallantry in the face of the enemy that can be awarded to British and Commonwealth forces.

Reynolds was 38 years old, and a temporary captain in the 12th Battalion, The Royal Scots (The Lothian Regiment), British Army during the First World War when the following deed took place for which he was awarded the VC.

On 20 September 1917 near Frezenberg, Belgium, Captain Reynolds' company were suffering heavy casualties from enemy machine-guns and a pill-box. Captain Reynolds reorganised his men and then proceeded alone, rushing from shell-hole to shell-hole under heavy fire. When near the pill-box, he threw a grenade which should have fallen inside, but the entrance was blocked, so crawling to the entrance he forced a phosphorus grenade in. This set the place on fire, killing three, and the remainder surrendered with two machine-guns. Afterwards, although wounded, Captain Reynolds captured another objective, with 70 prisoners and two more machine-guns.

The Medal
His Victoria Cross is displayed at the Royal Scots Museum, Edinburgh Castle, Scotland.

References

Monuments to Courage (David Harvey, 1999)
The Register of the Victoria Cross (This England, 1997)
VCs of the First World War - Passchendaele 1917 (Stephen Snelling, 1998)

External links
Location of grave and VC medal (Surrey)

1883 births
1948 deaths
Royal Scots officers
British World War I recipients of the Victoria Cross
Recipients of the Military Cross
British Army personnel of World War I
People from West Northamptonshire District
British Army recipients of the Victoria Cross
Military personnel from Northamptonshire